Enghelāb-e Eslāmi Technical College (EITTC) is a state technical college in Tehran, Iran, under the supervision of the Ministry of Science, Research and Technology and Technical and Vocational University. It is one of the largest technical colleges in Iran, the first one in Tehran), with 6,000 students. The college is named in honor of Iranian Revolution. Since the Technical and Vocational University has been developing its relationships with international universities and internal companies, the college was visited by IKKE Universitet, IPB and Leipzig University, and some more internal corporations and companies such as Iran Khodro.

Rankings
The first Technical College in iran according to بهترین دانشکده های فنی

Visitors

See also
 Tabriz Technical College
 Shamsipour Technical College
 Mohajer Technical And Vocational College of Isfahan
Iran University of Science and Technology
University of Tehran
Sharif University of Technology
Ferdowsi University of Mashhad
List of Iranian Research Centers
K. N. Toosi University of Technology
Amirkabir University of Technology

References

External links
Official Website

Educational institutions established in 1988
1988 establishments in Iran
Universities in Iran
Universities in Tehran
Technical and Vocational University campuses